Earth in the Balance: Ecology and the Human Spirit (paperback ) is a 1992 book written by Al Gore, published in June 1992, shortly before he was elected Vice President in the 1992 presidential election. Known by the short title Earth in the Balance, the book explains the world's ecological predicament and describes a range of policies to deal with the most pressing problems. It includes a proposed "Global Marshall Plan" to address current ecological issues.

Written while his son was recovering from a serious accident, Earth in the Balance became the first book written by a sitting U.S. Senator to make the New York Times bestseller list since John F. Kennedy's 1956 Profiles in Courage.

In 1993, Earth in the Balance was released in paperback and audiobook format on audio cassette tape.

It received the Robert F. Kennedy Center for Justice and Human Rights 1993 Book award given annually to a book that "most faithfully and forcefully reflects Robert Kennedy's purposes - his concern for the poor and the powerless, his struggle for honest and even-handed justice, his conviction that a decent society must assure all young people a fair chance, and his faith that a free democracy can act to remedy disparities of power and opportunity."

The book was followed by An Inconvenient Truth, a book that was the companion for a movie
narrated by Al Gore, shown at the 2006 Sundance Film Festival and released on 24 May 2006.

In the 2002 Futurama episode "Crimes of the Hot," Al Gore himself references the book and its "far more popular" fictional future sequel, Harry Potter and the Balance of Earth.

Opposition to adaptation
In the book Gore expresses opposition to adaptation to global warming, writing that adaption represented a “kind of laziness, an arrogant faith in our ability to react in time to save our skins”.

Editions
Gore, Al, Earth in the Balance: Ecology and the Human Spirit, 1992, Houghton Mifflin, Boston, MA, hardcover, 416 pages, .
Gore, Al, Earth in the Balance: Ecology and the Human Spirit, 2000-04-22, Houghton Mifflin, Boston, MA, hardcover, 416 pages, .
Gore, Al, Earth in the Balance: Ecology and the Human Spirit, New edition, 2000-07-26, Earthscan Publications Ltd., paperback, 440 pages, .
Gore, Al, Earth in the Balance: Ecology and the Human Spirit, New foreword, 2006, Rodale, Inc., paperback, 408 pages, .

Notes

External links
Booknotes interview with Gore on Earth in the Balance, February 16, 1992
Earth in the Balance - Book, Routledge/Earthscan

1992 non-fiction books
1992 in the environment
Books by Al Gore
Environmental non-fiction books
Political books
Houghton Mifflin books